Earle Everard "Pat" Partridge (July 7, 1900 – September 7, 1990) was a four-star general in the United States Air Force and a Command Pilot.

Biography
Earl Partridge graduated Ashby High School, Ashby, Massachusetts in 1917. Partridge enlisted in the United States Army in July 1918 at Fort Slocum, New York, and was assigned to the 5th Engineer Training Regiment. He went to France in August 1918 to join the 79th Division, participating in the Battle of Saint-Mihiel and Meuse-Argonne Offensive.

Partridge graduated from the United States Military Academy at West Point in the class of 1924.

He received flight training at Brooks Field and Kelly Field, and was a stunt pilot in the 1927 silent film Wings.

He taught mathematics at West Point, then went to the Panama Canal Zone with the 6th Composite Group. He was adjutant and assistant operations officer of the 1st Pursuit Group at Selfridge Field, and commanding officer of the 94th Pursuit Squadron.

In 1943, Partridge became chief of staff of the Fifteenth Air Force, and was named deputy commander of the Eighth Air Force in 1944. That June, he became commander of the 3rd Bomb Division, and assisted in its reorganization and movement to Okinawa.

Partridge returned to Headquarters Army Air Forces in January 1946 as assistant chief of staff for operations. He went to Japan in October 1948 as commanding general of the Fifth Air Force, serving through the first year of the Korean War. On his return to the United States in June 1951, he commanded the newly formed Air Research and Development Command at Baltimore, Maryland.

In April 1954, he became commander of the Far East Air Forces at Tokyo. He then became acting Commander of the Air Defense Command from July 20, 1955 to September 17, 1956; he was later named commander in chief of the North American Air Defense Command and the Air Defense Command, at Ent Air Force Base, Colorado Springs.

He gave an introduction to the 1957 Korean War film Battle Hymn starring Rock Hudson.

He retired from active duty on July 31, 1959. He died in Jupiter, Florida on September 7, 1990.

Partridge's awards and decorations include the Distinguished Service Cross, Distinguished Service Medal, Distinguished Flying Cross, Legion of Merit, Bronze Star, four Air Medals, World War I Victory Medal, American Defense Service Medal, World War II Victory Medal, Korean Service Medal, United Nations Korea Medal, Belgian Croix de Guerre with Palm; Companion, British Order of the Bath; French Croix de Guerre with two Palms; Knight, French Legion of Honor; Commander's Cross with Star, Polish Order of Polonia Restituta, and the Korean Order of Military Merit.

References

External links

General Earle Everard Partridge Honoree Record

1900 births
1990 deaths
People from Winchendon, Massachusetts
Military personnel from Massachusetts
United States Air Force generals
United States Military Academy alumni
United States Army personnel of World War I
United States Army Air Forces personnel of World War II
United States Air Force personnel of the Korean War
Recipients of the Distinguished Service Cross (United States)
Recipients of the Legion of Merit
Recipients of the Distinguished Flying Cross (United States)
Recipients of the Distinguished Service Medal (US Army)
Recipients of the Order of Polonia Restituta
Recipients of the Legion of Honour
Honorary Companions of the Order of the Bath
Recipients of the Croix de guerre (Belgium)
Recipients of the Croix de Guerre (France)
Recipients of the Air Medal

Recipients of the Order of Military Merit (Korea)
Air Corps Tactical School alumni
Military personnel from Pennsylvania